Moose Jaw Wakamow is a provincial electoral district for the Legislative Assembly of Saskatchewan, Canada.

This district was created for the 1967 election after the Saskatchewan government decided to retire a system of multiple-MLA electoral divisions for the cities of Regina, Saskatoon, and Moose Jaw.

The riding contains all of Moose Jaw south of Caribou Street, east of 9th Avenue and northwest of Thatcher Drive.

Members of the Legislative Assembly

Election results

Moose Jaw South (1967 – 1991)

References

External links 
Website of the Legislative Assembly of Saskatchewan
Elections Saskatchewan - Official Results of the 2011 Provincial Election
Saskatchewan Archives Board – Saskatchewan Election Results By Electoral Division
Map of Moose Jaw Wakamow riding as of 2016

Moose Jaw
Saskatchewan provincial electoral districts